Selenginsky District (Selengyn aimag) is an administrative and municipal district (raion), one of the twenty-one in the Republic of Buryatia, Russia. It is located in the center of the republic. Its administrative center is the town of Gusinoozyorsk. As of the 2010 Census, the total population of the district was 46,427, with the population of Gusinoozyorsk accounting for 52.9% of that number.

History
The district was established on December 12, 1923.

Administrative and municipal status
Within the framework of administrative divisions, Selenginsky District is one of the twenty-one in the Republic of Buryatia. It is divided into one town (an administrative division with the administrative center in the town (an inhabited locality) of Gusinoozyorsk), six selsoviets, and seven somons, which comprise thirty-six rural localities. As a municipal division, the district is incorporated as Selenginsky Municipal District. The Town of Gusinoozyorsk is incorporated an urban settlement, and the six selsoviets and seven somons are incorporated as twelve rural settlements within the municipal district. The town of Gusinoozyorsk serves as the administrative center of both the administrative and municipal district.

References

Notes

Sources

Districts of Buryatia
States and territories established in 1923
 
